Cargill is a privately held American multinational corporation.

Cargill or a variation may also refer to:

People
Cargill (surname)
Cargill family, U.S. business family
Cargill baronets, of Great Britain
Cargill sept, a sept of the Scottish Clan Drummond
Cargill Gilston Knott (1856–1922), Scottish physicist
Cargill MacMillan (disambiguation)
Lord Drummond of Cargill

Places
Cargill, Perthshire, Scotland, UK
Cargill, Ontario, Canada, a village

Mount Cargill, a volcanic outcrop in New Zealand

Organizations
Cargills (Ceylon), Sri Lankan conglomerate
Cargills Bank, a bank in Sri Lanka

Facilities and structures
Cargill's Castle, ruins in New Zealand's southern city of Dunedin
Cargill House, Lima, Livingston, New York State, USA; an NRHP-listed building
Walter Hurt Cargill House, Columbus, Georgia, USA; an NRHP-listed building
Cargill railway station, Perth and Kinross, Scotland, UK; a former station in Perthshire
Cargill's Corner, a major intersection in South Dunedin, New Zealand
Cargills Square, Jaffna, Sri Lanka, a shopping mall

Other uses
Cargill Creek, Bahamas
Cargill Falls, Quinebaug River, Putnam, Windham, Connecticut, USA
 Cargill High School, Invercargill, Southland, South Island, New Zealand
 Cargill Open Plan School, Tokoroa, Waikato, North Island, New Zealand; a primary school

See also

Invercargill, New Zealand, a city
Kargil (disambiguation)
Scargill (disambiguation)